The 1972 Brazilian Grand Prix was a Formula One non-championship race held at Interlagos on 30 March 1972. It was the inaugural Brazilian Grand Prix.

This race was held because at that time the FIA regulations required a demonstration race to be held as a quality check, before a Grand Prix was admitted as a championship race.

Classification

Notes 
 Fastest lap: Emerson Fittipaldi – 2:35.2

References
 
 
 

Brazilian Grand Prix
Brazilian Grand Prix
Grand Prix
Brazilian Grand Prix